Roundhead Township is one of the fifteen townships of Hardin County, Ohio, United States. As of the 2010 census the population was 720.

Geography
Located in the southwestern corner of the county, it borders the following townships:
Marion Township - north
McDonald Township - east
Richland Township, Logan County - southeast
Stokes Township, Logan County - southwest
Goshen Township, Auglaize County - west, south of Wayne Township
Wayne Township, Auglaize County - west, north of Goshen Township
Auglaize Township, Allen County - northwest corner

No municipalities are located in Roundhead Township, although the unincorporated community of Roundhead lies in the township's southeast.

Name and history
Roundhead Township was organized in 1832. The township is named for Wyandot chief Roundhead, who inhabited the area in the early 19th century.

Government
The township is governed by a three-member board of trustees, who are elected in November of odd-numbered years to a four-year term beginning on the following January 1. Two are elected in the year after the presidential election and one is elected in the year before it. There is also an elected township fiscal officer, who serves a four-year term beginning on April 1 of the year after the election, which is held in November of the year before the presidential election. Vacancies in the fiscal officership or on the board of trustees are filled by the remaining trustees.

References

External links
County website

Townships in Hardin County, Ohio
Townships in Ohio
1832 establishments in Ohio
Populated places established in 1832